Abbas ibn Shith was the king of the Ghurid dynasty. He overthrew his uncle Abu Ali ibn Muhammad in 1035, and ascended the Ghurid throne. During his later reign, the nobles of Ghor requested aid from the Ghaznavid sultan Ibrahim, who marched towards Ghor and deposed Abbas ibn Shith. Abbas was succeeded by his son Muhammad ibn Abbas, who agreed to pay tribute to the Ghaznavids.

References

Sources

 

11th-century Iranian people
Ghurid dynasty
1060 deaths
Year of birth unknown
11th-century rulers in Asia